Sinhaya (Lion) is a 2016 Sri Lankan Sinhala-language drama film written and directed by V.Sivadasan and produced by Sunil T.Fernando for Sunil T. Films. The film features Ranjan Ramanayake, Maheshi Madushanka, Sanath Gunathilake and Duleeka Marapana in the lead roles. Featuring music composed by Somapala Rathnayake as his final composing before death and cinematography by Sujith Nishantha. The film was released on 30 March 2016. It is the 1247th Sri Lankan film in the Sinhala cinema. The film has influenced by Bollywood blockbuster Mr. India (1987 film).

Plot
Weerasinghe (Ranjan) is a humble man who works as a tuition teacher and ensure the survival of ten homeless kids. The kids are caring by mentally retarded female Punchi akka (Duleeka). Weerasinghe's father was a scientist who worked with Professor (Nadeeka) and ask Weerasinghe to achieve his father's legacy, but he refuse them. Meanwhile, Sabhapathithuma (Palitha), who is a cunny man. He starts to build a luxury hotel and get to know about the Weerasinghe's house. Sabhapathithuma send several his men several occasions to agree Weerasinghe to rent te house to him, but all refused by Weerasinghe. Meanwhile, a journalist Hasitha (Maheshi) also engaged with Sabhapathithuma by revealing his dirty works. She lives with homeless kids at Weerasinghe's home as a renter. After series of incidents, Weerasinghe starts to achieve his father's legacy and found a watch made by his father which has the ability to make invisible. He starts use it and find money for the survival of kids and attack thugs several times. One day Hasitha was kidnapped by Sabhapathithuma henchman and Weerasinghe survived her with the help of invisible watch. The news about invisible man named Sathyamithra spread quickly among others, but no one knows the real story of it. Finally, minister (Ravindra) came to the scene and blame Sabhapathithuma for his work and sacked him from his profession. Finally, the house totally belongs to Weerasinghe and kids starts to refer him as their father. Meanwhile, Hasitha also reveal her attraction to Weerasinghe and also about the truth of Sathyamithra.

Cast
 Ranjan Ramanayake as Weerasinghe / Sathyamithra
 Maheshi Madushanka as Hasitha
 Sanath Gunathilake as Minister
 Ananda Wickramage as Newspaper chief editor 
 Duleeka Marapana as Punchi akka
 Palitha Silva as Sabhapathithuma
 Mihira Sirithilaka as Mudalali
 Nadeeka Gunasekara as Professor
 Gayathri Dias as Manike
Kokila Pawan Jayasuriya

Soundtrack

References 

2010s Sinhala-language films
2016 films